Thomas Powell may refer to:

Clergy 
Thomas Powell (rector of Cantref) (c. 1608 – 1660), Welsh Anglican priest and writer
Thomas Powell (archdeacon of Port Elizabeth) (fl. 1926–1964), Anglican priest in South Africa
Thomas Powell (archdeacon of Worcester)

Politicians
Sir Thomas Powell, 1st Baronet (1665–1720), MP
Thomas Powell (MP) (c. 1701–1752), Welsh politician
Thomas Powell (Irish politician) (1892–1971), Irish Fianna Fáil politician

Sports
Tom Powell (footballer) (born 2002), Australian rules footballer
Thomas Powell (ice hockey) (born 1986), Australian ice hockey player in the 2010 IIHF World Championship Division II
Tosh Powell or Thomas Morgan Powell, Welsh bantamweight champion

Other people
Thomas Powell (1641–1722), Quaker who secured the Bethpage Purchase on Long Island
Thomas Powell (mine owner) (1779–1863), Welsh millionaire, see Powell Duffryn
Thomas Powell (botanist) (1809–1887), missionary to the Samoan Islands, taxon authority, paleontologist, and botanist
Thomas Powell (1809–1887), English writer and fraudster 
Thomas Wilde Powell (1818–1897), English solicitor and stockbroker, patron of architects and artists

Other uses 
Thomas Powell (steamboat), a steamboat built in 1846 for service on the Hudson River, New York

See also
Thomas Powel (1845–1922), Welsh professor of Celtic
Thomas Douglas-Powell (born 1992), Australian volleyball player